Leucophyes pedestris is a species of cylindrical weevils belonging to the family Curculionidae.

Description 
The body is elongate shape, with a dark brown or greyish basic color. Adults can be found from May to September.

Distribution and habitat 
This species is present in the southern Europe, in the southern part of the Central Europe, in the Near East and in North Africa. It lives in open areas, pastures, dry grasslands and forest clearings.

References

Lixinae
Beetles described in 1761
Taxa named by Nikolaus Poda von Neuhaus